Androsace laggeri (syn. Androsace carnea), the pink rock jasmine, is a species of flowering plant in the family Primulaceae, native to the central Pyrenees. As Androsace carnea subsp. laggeri it has gained the Royal Horticultural Society's Award of Garden Merit.

References

laggeri
Flora of France
Flora of Spain
Plants described in 1853